The Embassy of Afghanistan in Canberra is the Islamic Republic of Afghanistan's diplomatic mission to the Commonwealth of Australia. It is also accredited to New Zealand and Fiji. It is located in the suburb of Deakin, at 4 Beale Crescent. The current Afghan Ambassador to Australia, serving since 2017, is Wahidullah Waissi.

History 
Before the establishment of the post-Taliban Islamic Republic, Afghanistan had no permanent resident diplomatic mission in Australia. The precursor to the current Embassy opened in 2002, out of rented premises in Deakin. Then Ambassador Mahmoud Saikal endeavoured to establish a permanent base for Afghanistan's diplomatic operations in Australia. The current building that houses the Embassy was opened on 18 August 2005, by visiting Afghan Foreign Minister Dr Abdullah and Australian Foreign Minister Alexander Downer. The Embassy has been conducted many activities, such as promoting Afghan culture, notably through the Afghan Film Festival, celebrations regarding the 50th anniversary of bilateral relations such as organising the Australian tour of the Zohra Orchestra, inaugurating the Afghanistan-Australian People to People Dialogue and fostering closer political and economic ties between Afghanistan and Australia, New Zealand and Fiji. They have also been active in promoting the history of Afghans in Australia, going back to Afghan Cameleers in the 19th century.

Afghanistan-Australia People to People Dialogue
The Afghanistan-Australia People to People Dialogue is a cross-cultural platform designed to strengthen the bilateral relationship between the two countries in the realms of culture, politics, trade and strategy. It was launched in 2017 by the embassy. The first dialogue comprised delegations from Afghanistan, the Australian government, think tanks, academia, students, activists, Afghan Australians, journalists and representatives from civil society and private business. There was a second dialogue in 2019. Its main theme was women’s empowerment and the Afghan delegation comprised nine Afghan women from a range of professional backgrounds.  The dialogue also focussed on the role of women in the Afghan peace process and the danger that the Taliban poses to women’s rights in Afghanistan.

List of Ambassadors 

 2002-2005: Mahmoud Saikal
 2005-2007: Mohammad Anwar Anwarzai
 2007-2011: Amanullah Jayhoon
 2011-2015: Nasir Andisha
 2017–Present: Wahidullah Waissi

See also 
 List of Afghan Ambassadors to Australia
 Afghan Film Festival in Australia

References 

Canberra
Afghanistan
Afghanistan–Australia relations